Wigfall is a surname. Notable people with the surname include:

Clare Wigfall (born 1976), British writer
James Wigfall (1942–1978), African-American stage actor
Louis Wigfall (1816–1874), American politician

See also
Wigfield (surname)